The Sony E PZ 18-110mm F4 G OSS in photography is an advanced constant maximum aperture zoom lens for the Sony E-mount, announced by Sony on September 9, 2016.

See also
List of Sony E-mount lenses
Sony E PZ 18-105mm F4 G OSS

References

Camera lenses introduced in 2014
28-135